Biscuits and gravy is a popular breakfast dish in the United States, especially in the South. The dish consists of soft dough biscuits covered in white gravy (sawmill gravy), made from the drippings of cooked pork sausage, flour, milk, and often (but not always) bits of sausage, bacon, ground beef, or other meat. The gravy is often flavored with black pepper.

History

The meal emerged as a distinct regional dish after the American Revolutionary War (1775–1783), when stocks of foodstuffs were in short supply. Breakfast was necessarily the most substantial meal of the day for a person facing a day of work on the plantations in the American South. In addition, the lack of supplies and money meant it had to be cheap.

Restaurant chains specializing in biscuits and gravy include Biscuitville, in Virginia and North Carolina, and Tudor's Biscuit World, in West Virginia.

Variations
Tomato gravy is white gravy mixed with crushed or diced tomatoes.

See also

 Chipped beef on toast
 Creamed eggs on toast
 Greasy spoon
 List of bread dishes
 List of regional dishes of the United States

References

External links
 
 

Cuisine of the Southern United States
Cuisine of the Midwestern United States
Bread dishes
Food combinations
American breakfast foods
Sausage dishes
American pork dishes